VMSA may refer to:

 Virgin Mobile South Africa, a mobile virtual network operator
 Veritas Volume Manager Storage Administrator, of the Veritas Volume Manager